Risco may refer to:

People
 Alcides Risco (born 1953), Cuban rower
 Cecilia del Risco (born 1960), Peruvian volleyball player
 Claudio Rîșco (born 1978), Romanian boxer
 Gonzalo Rodríguez Risco (born 1972), Peruvian playwright and screenwriter
 Jonay Risco (born 1987), Spanish kickboxer
 Juan Manuel Vargas Risco (born 1983), Peruvian football player
 Luis Miguel del Risco (born 1989), Italo-Colombian football player
 Manuel Risco, Spanish historian
 Vicente Risco (1884–1963), Galician intellectual

Places
 Risco, Badajoz, Spain
 Risco, Missouri, United States
 Valle del Risco, Panama

Other
 risco is the Spanish word for "cliff"